Baron Belstead, of Ipswich in the County of Suffolk, was a title in the Peerage of the United Kingdom. It was created on 27 January 1938 for the Conservative politician Sir John Ganzoni, 1st Baronet. He had already been created a Baronet, of Ipswich in the County of Suffolk, in the Baronetage of the United Kingdom on 22 March 1929. He was succeeded by his son John, the second Baron. He was also a Conservative politician and served as Leader of the House of Lords from 1988 to 1990. After the passing of the House of Lords Act 1999, Lord Belstead was created a life peer as Baron Ganzoni, of Ipswich in the County of Suffolk, on 17 November 1999, in order to allow him to remain in the House of Lords. He never married and the titles became extinct on his death in 2005.

Barons Belstead (1938)
Francis John Childs Ganzoni, 1st Baron Belstead (1882–1958)
John Julian Ganzoni, 2nd Baron Belstead (1932–2005)

Coat of arms

References

 
1938 establishments in the United Kingdom
2005 disestablishments in the United Kingdom
Extinct baronies in the Peerage of the United Kingdom
Noble titles created in 1938
Noble titles created for UK MPs
History of Ipswich